Leona na, the dark recluse, is a butterfly in the family Hesperiidae. It is found in Liberia. The habitat probably consists of dense forests.

References

Butterflies described in 1965
Erionotini